The Imperial Order of Saint Alexander Nevsky was an order of chivalry of the Russian Empire first awarded on  by Empress Catherine I of Russia.

History
The introduction of the Imperial Order of Saint Alexander Nevsky was envisioned by Emperor Peter I of Russia (r. 1682–1721) for rewarding military bravery in battle. However, he died before he could create the order. It was established by Empress Catherine I of Russia, in memory of the deeds of Saint Alexander Nevsky, patron Saint of the Russian capital of Saint Petersburg, for defending Russia against foreign invaders. The order was originally awarded to distinguished Russian citizens who had served their country with honor, mostly through political or military service.

It was first awarded on the occasion of the wedding of Grand Duchess Anna Petrovna of Russia and Charles Frederick, Duke of Holstein-Gottorp in 1725. A dozen guests received the reward, and the order quickly fell far behind the Order of Saint Andrew and the Order of Saint Catherine in prestige.

The Empress Catherine complained about the situation and by September 1725, she took it upon herself to determine who would receive the award. The Order of Saint Alexander was granted the highest esteem and was not usually bestowed upon people below the rank of Lieutenant-General or an equal political status. It also granted hereditary nobility. Additionally it was, including Polish King Augustus II the Strong and King Frederick IV of Denmark–Norway

Legacy
The Order of Saint Alexander Nevsky was abolished after the 1917 Russian Revolution, along with all other orders and titles of the Russian Empire.

In 1942, the Soviet Union revived the order as a purely military decoration and renamed it the more secular Order of Alexander Nevsky, and the Russian Federation revived it in 2010.

The heads of the Russian Imperial House in exile have continued to award the Order of St. Alexander Nevsky.  Grand Duchess Maria Vladimirovna, a pretender to the Russian throne and to the headship of the Russian Imperial House, continues to award a Russian Imperial Order of Saint Alexander Nevsky as a dynastic order of knighthood.  These actions are disputed by some members of the Romanov family.

In 2010, researchers in Saint Petersburg and Moscow published a book of all the names of the recipients of the original order. The combined number of honorees spanning the years 1725 to 1917 totaled 3,674.

Insignia Order St Alexander Nevsky

Recipients

 Abbas II of Egypt
 Adam Olsufiev
 Count Nikolay Adlerberg
 Duke Adolf Friedrich of Mecklenburg
 Afonso, Prince of Beira
 Ahmad Shah Qajar
 Albert I of Belgium
 Prince Albert of Prussia (1809–1872)
 Prince Albert of Saxe-Altenburg
 Archduke Albrecht, Duke of Teschen
 Albert, Prince Consort
 Yevgeni Ivanovich Alekseyev
 Alexander I of Russia
 Alexander II of Russia
 Alexander III of Russia
 Alexander Kurakin (1697)
 Alexander Nikolaevich Golitsyn
 Duke Alexander of Oldenburg
 Duke Alexander of Württemberg (1771–1833)
 Alexei Nikolaevich, Tsarevich of Russia
 Alfred, 2nd Prince of Montenuovo
 Ippolit Andreev
 Ivane Andronikashvili
 Fyodor Apraksin
 Prince Arisugawa Takehito
 Prince Arisugawa Taruhito
 Prince August, Duke of Dalarna
 Prince August of Württemberg
 Prince Augustus of Prussia
 Theodor Avellan
 Karl Gustav von Baggovut
 Pyotr Bagration
 Pyotr Romanovich Bagration
 Alexander Barclay de Tolly-Weymarn
 Michael Andreas Barclay de Tolly
 Joachim Otto von Bassewitz
 Vasili Bebutov
 Constantine Esperovich Beloselsky-Belozersky
 Alexander von Benckendorff (diplomat)
 Andrew Bertie
 Aleksei Birilev
 Otto von Bismarck
 Gebhard Leberecht von Blücher
 Georgy Bobrikov
 Nikolai Bobyr
 Julius von Bose
 Nikolai von Bunge
 Prince Carl, Duke of Västergötland
 Carlos I of Portugal
 Charles X
 Charles XIII
 Charles XV
 Zakhar Chernyshev
 Piotr Grigoryevich Chernyshev
 Christian IX of Denmark
 Andrzej Ciechanowiecki
 Mikhail Pavlovich Danilov
 Nikolay Ivanovich Demidov
 Porfirio Díaz
 Hans Karl von Diebitsch
 Dmitry Dashkov
 Dmitry Petrovich Dokhturov
 Vasily Dolgorukov-Krymsky
 Mikhail Drozdovsky
 Fyodor Dubasov
 Adam Duncan, 1st Viscount Duncan
 Alexander Alexandrovich Dushkevich
 Andrei Eberhardt
 Edward VII
 Johann Martin von Elmpt
 Ernest I, Duke of Saxe-Coburg and Gotha
 Vladimir Etush
 Archduke Eugen of Austria
 Aleksei Evert
 Ferdinand I of Bulgaria
 Ferdinand II of Portugal
 Ferdinand VII of Spain
 Prince Ferdinand of Saxe-Coburg and Gotha
 Francis IV, Duke of Modena
 Franz Joseph I of Austria
 Archduke Franz Karl of Austria
 Frederick VI of Denmark
 Frederick VII of Denmark
 Frederick VIII of Denmark
 Frederick I, Grand Duke of Baden
 Prince Frederick, Duke of York and Albany
 Frederick William III of Prussia
 Prince Frederick of the Netherlands
 Frederick Charles Louis, Duke of Schleswig-Holstein-Sonderburg-Beck
 Archduke Friedrich, Duke of Teschen
 Ivan Fullon
 Prince Fushimi Sadanaru
 Ivan Ganetsky
 Ivan Gannibal
 Gavriil Gagarin
 George IV
 George V
 George Mikhailovich Romanov
 Aleksandr Gerngross
 Alexander von Güldenstubbe
 August Neidhardt von Gneisenau
 Dmitry Mikhailovich Golitsyn the Elder
 Dmitry Mikhailovich Golitsyn the Younger
 Colmar Freiherr von der Goltz
 Nikolay Gondatti
 Gregory IV of Antioch
 Oskar Gripenberg
 Curtis Guild Jr.
 Wladyslaw Gurowski
 Gustaf V
 Gustaf VI Adolf
 Gustav, Prince of Vasa
 Haakon VII of Norway
 John Maurice Hauke
 Lodewijk van Heiden
 Prince Heinrich XV of Reuss-Plauen
 Gregor von Helmersen
 Prince Henry of Prussia (1781–1846)
 Prince Hermann of Saxe-Weimar-Eisenach (1825–1901)
 Gavriil Ignatyev
 Illarion Illarionovich Vasilchikov
 Alexander Imeretinsky
 Ivan Cherkasov
 Archduke John of Austria
 Prince Johann of Schleswig-Holstein-Sonderburg-Glücksburg
 John VI of Portugal
 Joseph, Duke of Saxe-Altenburg
 Kyprian Kandratovich
 Prince Kan'in Kotohito
 Karl Anton, Prince of Hohenzollern
 Karl Philipp, Prince of Schwarzenberg
 Prince Karl Theodor of Bavaria
 Alexander von Kaulbars
 Paisi Kaysarov
 Amanullah Khan
 Mikhail Khilkov
 Pyotr Kikin
 Jan Hendrik van Kinsbergen
 Hugo von Kirchbach
 Prince Kitashirakawa Yoshihisa
 Johann von Klenau
 Hans von Koester
 Prince Komatsu Akihito
 Grand Duke Konstantin Konstantinovich of Russia
 Grand Duke Konstantin Nikolayevich of Russia
 Konstantin of Hohenlohe-Schillingsfürst
 Johann Albrecht Korff
 Apostol Kostanda
 Wincenty Krasinski
 Mikhail Krechetnikov
 Alexey Kurakin
 Boris Kurakin (1733)
 Aleksey Kuropatkin
 Mikhail Kutuzov
 Sergey Stepanovich Lanskoy
 Mikhail Lazarev
 Leopold I of Belgium
 Leopold II of Belgium
 Leopold IV, Duke of Anhalt
 Alexander Mikhailovich Lermontov
 George Maximilianovich, 6th Duke of Leuchtenberg
 Sergei Georgievich, 8th Duke of Leuchtenberg
 Levan V Dadiani
 Louis IV, Grand Duke of Hesse
 Louis XVIII
 Prince Louis of Battenberg
 Friedrich von Löwis of Menar
 Archduke Ludwig Viktor of Austria
 Luís I of Portugal
 Manuel II of Portugal
 Grand Duchess Maria Vladimirovna of Russia
 Mikhail Matyushkin
 Duke William of Mecklenburg-Schwerin
 Duke Charles of Mecklenburg
 Samad bey Mehmandarov
 Emmanuel von Mensdorff-Pouilly
 Klemens von Metternich
 Feofil Egorovich Meyendorf
 Grand Duke Michael Nikolaevich of Russia
 Grand Duke Michael Alexandrovich of Russia
 Miguel I of Portugal
 Mikhail Volkonsky
 Milan I of Serbia
 Mikhail Miloradovich
 Pavel Mishchenko
 Mohammed Alim Khan
 Alexander von Moller
 Helmuth von Moltke the Elder
 Nikolay Mordvinov (admiral)
 Burkhard Christoph von Münnich
 Mikhail Nikitich Muravyov
 Valentin Musin-Pushkin
 Ivan Nabokov
 Napoleon III
 Kamran Mirza Nayeb es-Saltaneh
 Ivan Neplyuyev
 Nicholas I of Russia
 Nicholas II of Russia
 Grand Duke Nicholas Nikolaevich of Russia (1831–1891)
 Arkady Nikanorovich Nishenkov
 August Ludwig von Nostitz
 Karl Nesselrode
 Peter Obolyaninov
 Alexey Fyodorovich Orlov
 Oscar II
 Fabian Gottlieb von der Osten-Sacken
 Archduke Otto of Austria (1865–1906)
 Gore Ouseley
 Fyodor Palitzin
 Duke Paul Frederick of Mecklenburg
 Pavel Yaguzhinsky
 Pedro V of Portugal
 Duke Peter of Oldenburg
 Prince Philippe, Count of Flanders
 Konstanty Ludwik Plater
 Mikhail Mikhailovich Pleshkov
 Stanislaw August Poniatowski
 Alexander Stepanovich Popov
 Carlo Andrea Pozzo di Borgo
 Yevfimiy Putyatin
 Mohammad Shah Qajar
 Mohammad Taqi Mirza Rokn ed-Dowleh
 Mozaffar ad-Din Shah Qajar
 Naser al-Din Shah Qajar
 Fyodor Radetsky
 Evgeny Aleksandrovich Radkevich
 Alexander Ragoza
 Henri de Rigny
 Roman Vorontsov
 Christopher Roop
 Rudolf, Prince of Liechtenstein
 Rudolf, Crown Prince of Austria
 Adam Rzhevusky
 Anton Yegorovich von Saltza
 Alexander Samsonov
 Johan Eberhard von Schantz
 Sergei Sheydeman
 Yakov Schkinsky
 Alexei Senyavin
 Grand Duke Sergei Alexandrovich of Russia
 Ivan Shestakov
 Georg von Stackelberg
 Gustav Ernst von Stackelberg
 Curt von Stedingk
 Archduke Stephen of Austria (Palatine of Hungary)
 Vladimir Sukhomlinov
 Alexander Suvorov
 Peter Tekeli
 Alfred von Tirpitz
 Dmitry Troshchinsky
 Erast Tsytovich
 Prince Valdemar of Denmark
 Sergei Vasilchikov
 Georgy Vasmund
 Nikita Villebois
 Grand Duke Vladimir Alexandrovich of Russia
 Grand Duke Vladimir Kirillovich of Russia
 Sava Vladislavich
 Illarion Vorontsov-Dashkov
 Arthur Wellesley, 1st Duke of Wellington
 Wilhelm II, German Emperor
 William I of Württemberg
 William I, German Emperor
 William II of the Netherlands
 William II of Württemberg
 William IV
 Duke William of Württemberg
 Sergei Witte
 Duke Eugen of Württemberg (1788–1857)
 Sir James Wylie, 1st Baronet
 Yamagata Aritomo
 Aleksey Petrovich Yermolov
 Prince Zaitao
 Matija Zmajevic
 Dmitry Zuyev

References

St. Alexander Nevsky, Order of
Awards established in 1725
1725 establishments in the Russian Empire
Saint Alexander Nevsky, Order of
Saint Alexander Nevsky, Order of
Alexander Nevsky